The 1974 Texas A&M Aggies football team represented Texas A&M University in the 1974 NCAA Division I football season as a member of the Southwest Conference (SWC). The Aggies were led by head coach Emory Bellard in his third season and finished with a record of eight wins and three losses (8–3 overall, 5–2 in the SWC).

Schedule

Roster

References

Texas AandM
Texas A&M Aggies football seasons
Texas AandM Aggies football